Collingwood is an inner-city suburb in Melbourne, Victoria, Australia, 3km north-east of Melbourne's Central Business District, located within the City of Yarra local government area. Collingwood recorded a population of 9,179 at the 2021 census.

The area now known as Collingwood is thought to have been named Yálla-birr-ang by the Wurundjeri people, the original Indigenous inhabitants of the area. Following colonisation, the suburb was named in 1842 after Baron Collingwood or an early hotel which bore his name. Collingwood is one of the oldest suburbs in Melbourne and is bordered by Smith Street, Alexandra Parade, Hoddle Street and Victoria Parade.

Collingwood is notable for its historical buildings, with many nineteenth century dwellings, shops and factories still in use. Its major thoroughfare Smith Street, is one of Melbourne's major nightlife and retail strips, and has been voted the coolest street in the world.

History

Toponymy
It was 'named after' Lord Horatio Nelson's 'favourite admiral' Cuthbert Collingwood, 1st Baron Collingwood (or, possibly after the Collingwood Hotel which existed there and was named after the admiral) by surveyor Robert Hoddle, under instructions from Superintendent Charles La Trobe, in 1842.

Popular culture
Australian author Frank Hardy set the novel Power Without Glory in a fictionalised version of the suburb, named Carringbush. The name is used by a number of businesses in the area, such as "Carringbush Business Centre". At one time a ward in the City of Yarra that includes part of Collingwood was actually named Carringbush.

Establishment

Subdivision and sale of land in Collingwood began in 1838, and was mostly complete by the 1850s. Collingwood was declared a municipality, separate from the City of Melbourne on 24 April 1855, the first to follow the state's major population centres of Melbourne and Geelong. Collingwood was proclaimed a town in 1873, and later a city in 1876.

Collingwood's early development was directly impacted by the boom in Melbourne's population and economy during the Victorian gold rush of the 1850s and 1860s. This resulted in the construction of a large number of small dwellings, as well as schools, shops and churches to support this new population. Around the same time, large industrial developments such as a flour mill and the Fosters brewery were being established.

19th and 20th centuries
In the 1870s, Smith Street became the dominant shopping strip, with its tram line established in 1887. Many of Collingwood's grand public buildings were erected in the 1880s, including the post office and town hall. Collingwood also had a strong temperance movement, with two "coffee palaces" springing up in the 1870s, including the large and grand Collingwood Coffee Palace (now the facade of Woolworths – minus original classical pediment and mansard).

At the turn of the century Collingwood's Smith Street rivalled Chapel Street in Prahran as the dominant home of suburban emporiums and department stores. The first G.J. Coles store was opened in the street in 1912.

Since the 1950s, Collingwood has been home to many groups battling to save the suburb's unique character against development and gentrification.

In 1958 residents rallied at Collingwood Town Hall against the Housing Commission of Victoria's slum reclamation projects, which would see demolition orders for 122 of the suburb's homes.

In the 1970s, 150 residents protested against plans for the F-19 freeway, with some putting themselves in front of earthmovers during the construction.

The Collingwood Action Group formed in 2006 to fight the "Banco" development, a large mixed use project on Smith Street.

Recent history
In 2010, over 2,000 people rallied to save The Tote Hotel, a popular live music venue, which became a potential state election issue.

In 2016, the Bendigo street housing campaign began in northeast Collingwood, in which the community took control of up to 15 empty state government owned houses, in an attempt to provide housing for Melbourne's rising homeless population, in the absence of adequate public housing.

Geography

Collingwood's topography is mostly flat, but a prominent slope extends from Hoddle Street up to Smith Street, and also along sections of Hoddle Street.

The suburb is notable for its historical buildings, with many nineteenth century dwellings, shops and factories still in use. From its early days large commercial buildings often coexisted with small dwellings, occupied by working-class families and the mixture of industry and community continues to the present time. For example, Oxford and Cambridge Streets are dominated by imposing red-brick factories and warehouses, formerly occupied by the Foy and Gibson company, but also feature a number of stone, brick and timber dwellings that date back to the earliest days of the suburb.

Culture

Sport
The Collingwood Football Club (the Magpies) has a history dating back to 1892 as an incorporated football club. They were once housed at Victoria Park and are now based at the Melbourne Cricket Ground (MCG).

In recent years they won the 2010 Grand Final rematch against St Kilda. They have won 15 VFL/AFL premierships, which is the second most in the league behind Carlton and Essendon, and also won the 1896 VFA premiership.

Community radio
3CR is an independent community radio station that is located at the Victoria Parade end of Smith Street. The station has been based in the suburb since 1977 and its frequency is 855AM.

PBS 106.7FM relocated from St Kilda to Collingwood and is located at 47 Easey Street. PBS is a community radio station that celebrated its 25th year of broadcasting in 2004.

Arts
The Collingwood arts precinct, known as Collingwood Yards, is located on the site of the former Collingwood Technical School and opened on 13 March 2021. Circus Oz is also located in Perry Street and has a purpose-built Melba Spiegeltent.

Economy
Jetstar and Madman Entertainment have head offices in Collingwood.

Commercial areas

The main commercial area is Smith Street, which borders Fitzroy. In 2021, Smith Street was named the coolest street in the world.

Gay village
Collingwood is one of Melbourne's gay villages with several gay oriented entertainment venues.
These include the Peel Dancebar which, in 2007, was granted the legal right to ban heterosexual patrons from the bar. By November 2019, sex on premises venue Club 80 had operated in Collingwood for over twenty years.

Education

Collingwood Technical School was established in July 1912 as a trades and technical training school. The school closed in 1987 and, combined with the Preston Technical School, was the basis for the formation of the Melbourne Polytechnic, which has a Collingwood campus on Otter Street.

Collingwood College, a state P-12 school, is located in the suburb. The private tertiary education provider Collarts is located in the suburb with its main campus on Wellington Street, and specialises in design and creative arts degrees.

Demographics

The next most common countries of birth were England 4.3%, New Zealand 3.6%, Vietnam 3.1%, Ethiopia 1.9% and China 1.8%. 68.3% of people spoke only English at home. Other languages spoken at home included Vietnamese 4.0%, Mandarin 2.2%, Somali 1.9%, Oromo 1.8%, and Cantonese 1.7%. The most common response for religion was No Religion at 58%.

Housing

Collingwood's housing consists of a large number of high-rise housing commission flats and a number of older single and double storey former workers cottages on small subdivisions.

More recently older warehouses and factories have been converted into fashionable apartments and there has been modern townhouse infill and medium density unit development.

Governance

The City of Collingwood existed from 1855 until 1994.

Public and commercial buildings

Collingwood has many buildings listed on the Victorian Heritage Register and several notable commercial and public buildings. Yorkuprhire Brewery, built in 1880 to the design of James Wood, with its polychrome brick and mansard roof tower, was once Melbourne's tallest building. For many years it has been subject to development proposals and the heritage stables were at one stage demolished without a permit, however the site remains neglected.

The former Collingwood Post Office was built between 1891 and 1892 in the Victorian Mannerist style, to the design of John Marsden and is similar to Rupertswood, with its tall tower.

Prominent hotels include the Leinster Arms Hotel, established in 1865 and is the only single storey hotel built in Melbourne in that era, the Sir Robert Peel ("The Peel") Hotel and the Vine Hotel.

The original Collingwood Magistrates' Court closed on 1 February 1985, but continued local need saw the establishment of the Neighbourhood Justice Centre court in the suburb in 2007.

Despite its name, the Collingwood Children's Farm is in the neighbouring suburb of Abbotsford.

Transport

Transport within Collingwood consists mainly of narrow one-way streets. The suburb is bounded by main roads: Smith Street to the west, Victoria Parade to the south, Hoddle Street to the east and Alexandra Parade to the north. Major tramlines are on Victoria Street (tram route 109) and Smith Street (route 86), which are on the edge of the suburb. Johnston, Wellington and Langridge Streets are the main arterials going through the suburb.

The Collingwood railway station is in neighbouring Abbotsford.

Notable people

 Emma Minnie Boyd (1858–1936), artist
 John Cowan Duncan (1901–1955), company manager
 Edward Petherick (1847-1917), Australian bookseller, book collector, bibliographer and archivist
 John Hunter Patterson (1841–1930), grazier and mining investor
 Keith Stackpole (born 1940), cricketer

References

External links

Australian Places – Collingwood
Collingwood Historical Society

Suburbs of Melbourne
Gay villages in Australia
Slums in Australia
Suburbs of the City of Yarra